The Kingdom of Israel, or the Kingdom of Samaria, was an Israelite kingdom in the Southern Levant during the Iron Age. The kingdom controlled the areas of Samaria, Galilee and parts of Transjordan. Its capital, for the most part, was Samaria (modern Sebastia). A separate Israelite polity, named the Kingdom of Judah, with its capital in Jerusalem, existed to its south.

The Hebrew Bible depicts the Kingdom of Israel, also known as the Kingdom of Samaria, as one of two successor states to the United Kingdom of Israel ruled by King David and his son Solomon, the other being the Kingdom of Judah; some historians and archaeologists, however, do not believe in the existence of a United Kingdom as depicted in the Bible. It can be said with certainty that the regions of Samaria and Galilee underwent a period of urbanization during the 10th century BCE, and that its towns were united as a kingdom ruled by the Omride dynasty in the 9th century BCE, whose political center was the city of Samaria, where a lavish palace existed.

The Kingdom of Israel was conquered by the Neo-Assyrian Empire around 720 BCE. The records of Sargon II of Assyria indicate that he deported 27,290 Israelites – around one fifth of the population of the Kingdom of Israel – to Mesopotamia; this deportation became the basis for the Jewish idea of the Ten Lost Tribes of Israel. Some Israelites migrated to the southern kingdom of Judah, while those Israelites that remained in Samaria, concentrated mainly around Mount Gerizim, came to be known as Samaritans. Foreign groups were also settled by the Assyrians in the territories of the conquered kingdom.

History

The existence of an Israelite state in the north is documented in 9th century inscriptions. The earliest mention is from the Kurkh stela of c.853 BCE, when Shalmaneser III mentions "Ahab the Israelite", plus the denominative for "land", and his ten thousand troops. This kingdom will have included parts of the lowlands (the Shephelah), the Jezreel plain, lower Galilee and parts of the Transjordan. Ahab's forces were part of an anti-Assyrian coalition, implying that the kingdom was ruled by an urban elite, possessed a royal and state cult with large urban temples, and had scribes, mercenaries, and an administrative apparatus. In all this, it was similar to other recently-founded kingdoms of the time, such as Ammon and Moab.

In later Assyrian inscriptions, the kingdom is referred to as the "House of Omri". Shalmanesser III's "Black Obelisk" mentions Jehu, son of Omri; and King Adad-Nirari III of Assyria, who leaded an expedition into the Levant in 803, mentions "the Hatti-land and Amurru-land, the cities of Tyre and Sidon, Philistia, Edom, Aram, and the mat (land) of Hu-um-ri", or Omri. Another inscription from the same king introduces a third way of talking about the kingdom, as Samaria, in the phrase "Joash of Samaria". The use of Omri's name to refer to the kingdom still survived, and was used by Sargon II in the phrase "the whole house of Omri" in describing his conquest of the city of Samaria in 722 BCE. It is significant that the Assyrians never mention the Kingdom of Judah until the end of the 8th century, when it was an Assyrian vassal: possibly they never had contact with it, or possibly they regarded it as a vassal of Israel/Samaria or Aram, or possibly the southern kingdom did not exist during this period. 
 
Samaria is one of the most universally accepted archaeological sites from the biblical period. At around 850 BCE, the Mesha Stele records the victory of the Kingdom of Moab (in today's Jordan), under, King Mesha, against the Kingdom of Israel, under king Omri and his son Ahab.

Archaeological finds, ancient Near Eastern texts, and the biblical record testify that in the time of the Omride dynasty, the Kingdom of Israel ruled in the mountainous Galilee, at Hazor in the upper Jordan Valley, in large parts of Transjordan between the Arnon and the Yarmouk Rivers, and in the coastal plain of the Sharon.

In the Bible

One tradition source for the history of the Kingdom of Israel has been the Jewish Bible, written by authors in Jerusalem, the capital of the Kingdom of Judah; being written by a rival kingdom, it is inspired by ideological and theological viewpoints that influence the narrative. Anachronisms, legends and literary forms also affect the story. Some of the events are believed to have been recorded long after the destruction of the kingdom of Israel. Biblical archaeology has both confirmed and challenged parts of the biblical account. According to the Jewish Bible, there existed a United Kingdom of Israel (the United Monarchy), ruled from Jerusalem by David and his son Solomon, after whose death the Israel and Judah separated into two kingdoms. 

The first mention of the name Israel is from an Egyptian inscription, the Merneptah Stele, dating from the Late Bronze Age (c. 1208 BCE); this gives little solid information, but indicates that the name of the later kingdom was borrowed rather than originating with the kingdom itself.

Relations between the kingdoms of Israel and Judah
According to the Hebrew Bible, for the first sixty years after the split, the kings of Judah tried to re-establish their authority over the northern kingdom, and there was perpetual war between them. For the following eighty years, there was no open war between them, and, for the most part, they were in friendly alliance, co-operating against their common enemies, especially against Damascus.The conflict between Israel and Judah was temporarily settled when Jehoshaphat, King of Judah, allied himself with the reigning house of Israel, Ahab, through marriage. Later, Jehosophat's son and successor, Jehoram of Judah, married Ahab's daughter Athaliah, cementing the alliance. However, the sons of Ahab were slaughtered by Jehu following his coup d'état around 840 BCE.

Destruction of the Kingdom, 732–720 BCE 

In c. 732 BCE, king Pekah of Israel, while allied with Rezin, king of Aram, threatened Jerusalem. Ahaz, king of Judah, appealed to Tiglath-Pileser III, the king of Assyria, for help. After Ahaz paid tribute to Tiglath-Pileser, Tiglath-Pileser sacked Damascus and Israel, annexing Aram and territory of the tribes of Reuben, Gad and Manasseh in Gilead including the desert outposts of Jetur, Naphish and Nodab. People from these tribes, including the Reubenite leader, were taken captive and resettled in the region of the Khabur River system, in Halah, Habor, Hara and Gozan. Tiglath-Pilesar also captured the territory of Naphtali and the city of Janoah in Ephraim, and an Assyrian governor was placed over the region of Naphtali.

The remainder of the northern kingdom of Israel continued to exist within the reduced territory as an independent kingdom until around 720 BCE, when it was again invaded by Assyria and the rest of the population deported. During the three-year siege of Samaria in the territory of Ephraim by the Assyrians, Shalmaneser V died and was succeeded by Sargon II, who himself records the capture of that city thus: "Samaria I looked at, I captured; 27,280 men who dwelt in it I carried away" into Assyria. Thus, around 720 BCE, after two centuries, the kingdom of the ten tribes came to an end. Some of the Israelite captives were resettled in the Khabur region, and the rest in the land of the Medes, thus establishing Hebrew communities in Ecbatana and Rages. The Book of Tobit additionally records that Sargon had taken other captives from the northern kingdom to the Assyrian capital of Nineveh, in particular Tobit from the town of Thisbe in Naphtali.

The Jewish Bible relates that the population of the Kingdom of Israel was exiled, becoming known as the Ten Lost Tribes. To the south, the Tribe of Judah, the Tribe of Simeon (that was "absorbed" into Judah), the Tribe of Benjamin and the people of the Tribe of Levi, who lived among them of the original Israelite nation, remained in the southern Kingdom of Judah. The Kingdom of Judah continued to exist as an independent state until 586 BCE, when it was conquered by the Neo-Babylonian Empire.

Samaritan version
Samaritan tradition states that much of the population of the Northern Kingdom of Israel remained in place after the Exile, including the Tribes of Naphtali, Menasseh, Benjamin and Levi – being the progenitors of the modern Samaritans. In their book The Bible Unearthed, Israeli authors Israel Finkelstein and Neil Asher Silberman estimate that only a fifth (about 40,000) of the population of the northern Kingdom of Israel were actually resettled out of the area during the two deportation periods under Tiglath-Pileser III and Sargon II. Many of the Northern Tribes also fled south to the Kingdom of Judah; Jerusalem seems to have expanded in size five-fold during this period, requiring a new wall to be built, and a new source of water Siloam to be provided by King Hezekiah.

Medieval Rabbinic fable
In medieval Rabbinic fable, the concept of the ten tribes becomes confounded with accounts of the Assyrian deportations, leading to the myth of the "Ten Lost Tribes".

Recorded history
In their book The Bible Unearthed, Israeli authors Israel Finkelstein and Neil Asher Silberman estimate that only a fifth (about 40,000) of the population of the northern Kingdom of Israel were actually resettled out of the area during the two deportation periods under Tiglath-Pileser III and Sargon II. No known non-Biblical record exists of the Assyrians having exiled people from four of the tribes of Israel: Dan, Asher, Issachar, Zebulun. Descriptions of the deportation of people from Reuben, Gad, Manasseh, Ephraim and Naphtali indicate that only a portion of these tribes were deported, and the places to which they were deported are known locations given in the accounts. The deported communities are mentioned as still existing at the time of the composition of the Books of Kings and Chronicles and did not disappear by assimilation. 2 Chronicles 30:1-18 explicitly mentions northern Israelites who had been spared by the Assyrians, in particular people of Ephraim, Manasseh, Asher, Issachar and Zebulun, and how members of the latter three returned to worship at the Temple in Jerusalem during the reign of Hezekiah.

Religion
The religious climate of the Kingdom of Israel appears to have followed two major trends. The first, that of worship of Yahweh. The Jewish Bible, however, states that part of the northern Israelites also adored Baal – as detailed in the Hebrew Bible and in the Baal cycle discovered at Ugarit. The religion of ancient Israel is sometimes referred to by modern scholars as Yahwism.

According to the Hebrew Bible, Jeroboam built two places of worship, one at Bethel and one at far northern Dan, as alternatives to the Temple in Jerusalem. He did not want the people of his kingdom to have religious ties to Jerusalem, the capital city of the rival Kingdom of Judah. He erected golden bulls at the entrance to the temples to represent the national god. The Hebrew Bible, written from the perspective of scribes in Jerusalem, referred to these acts as the way of Jeroboam or the errors of Jeroboam.

The Jewish Bible also states that Ahab allowed the cult worship of Baal to become acceptable of the kingdom. His wife Jezebel was the daughter of the Phoenician king of Tyre and a devotee to Baal worship.

Royal houses

According to the Bible, the Northern Kingdom had 19 kings across 9 different dynasties throughout its 208 years of existence.

List of proposed Assyrian references to Kingdom of Israel (Samaria)

The table below lists all the historical references to the Kingdom of Israel (Samaria) in Assyrian records. King Omri's name takes the Assyrian shape of "Humri", his kingdom or dynasty that of Bit Humri or alike - the "House of Humri/Omri".

References

Notes

Citations

Sources

External links
 About Israel - The Information Center About Israel
  Biblical History. The Jewish History Resource Center - Project of the Dinur Center for Research in Jewish History, The Hebrew University of Jerusalem
 Complete Bible Genealogy A synchronized chart of the kings of Israel and Judah

 
 
10th-century BC establishments
8th-century BC disestablishments
Books of Kings
Israel, Kingdom of
Israel
Political entities in the Land of Israel
States and territories established in the 10th century BC
States and territories disestablished in the 8th century BC